The 1903 Buffalo football team represented the University of Buffalo as an independent during the 1903 college football season. The team coach was Ray Turnbull and the team was 4–4 overall for the year.

Schedule

References

Buffalo
Buffalo Bulls football seasons
Buffalo football